Rataje nad Sázavou is a market town in Kutná Hora District in the Central Bohemian Region of the Czech Republic. It has about 500 inhabitants. The historic town centre is well preserved and is protected by law as an urban monument zone.

Administrative parts
The villages of Malovidy and Mirošovice are administrative parts of Rataje nad Sázavou.

Geography
It is located on the right bank of the Sázava River, which forms the municipal border. Most of the municipal territory is situated in the Vlašim Uplands, the eastern part lies in the Upper Sázava Hills.

History

The first written mention of Rataje nad Sázavou is from 1156 and that the city existed as a stronghold and a marketplace. There are not any written reports about the exact date of its origin but it was probably about 946.

A castle, partly brick, partly wooden was founded on the place of the current castle in the middle of the 10th century. The castle was built as a border fortress of the Zlič region. This was evidenced when bronze and ceramic ornaments were found in 1890 when a road around the castle was built.

Rataje was rebuilt after a large fire in the middle of the 13th century and was the property of the king at that time. John of Bohemia gave Rataje to Henry of Lipá. The lords of Lipa then built a lower castle called Pirkštejn. Hynce Ptáček of Pirkstein gained Rataje in 1420. He was the highest hofmeister and münzmeister of the Kingdom of Bohemia, an administrator of the royal towns including Kutna Hora and a guardian of the future king, George of Poděbrady. He is the most important holder of Rataje and is buried in the family tomb in the local church.

Many noble families owned Rataje later on. Ladislav, Václav and Jan of Malešice began reconstruction on the castle between 1531 and 1579. In 1656, William Francis of Talmberk initiated reconstruction of the entire castle and his son František Maxmilián Leopold completed it. Later, Rataje was held by the Liechtenstein family from 1772 to 1919.

Demographics

Transport
There are two railway tracks (Kolín–Rataje nad Sázavou–Ledečko and Ledeč nad Sázavou–Rataje nad Sázavou–Čerčany, served by five railway stations: Rataje nad Sázavou, Rataje nad Sázavou předměstí, Rataje nad Sázavou zastávka, Rataje nad Sázavou-Ivaň and Mirošovice u Rataj nad Sázavou.

Sights
Pirkštejn Castle was founded in the mid-14th century as a part of the town fortifications. Today it is owned by the church and is inaccessible to the public.

The municipality of Rataje bought Rataje Castle in 1933 and placed a municipal office, post office, police station and school there. Today it also houses the Museum of Central Posázaví.

The Church of Saint Matthew was built in the early Baroque style in 1675–1691 and has remained almost unchanged since then. It replaced a church from the 14th century.

In popular culture
A recreation of the town as it existed in 1403 is prominently featured in the Czech role-playing game Kingdom Come: Deliverance.

Notable people
Jan Peka (1894–1985), ice hockey player

References

External links

Market towns in the Czech Republic
Populated places in Kutná Hora District